Monte delle Figne (Figne Mountain) is a mountain in Liguria, northern Italy, part of the Ligurian Apennines. It lies at an altitude of 1172 metres.

Geography 
The mountain is located in the provinces of Genoa and Alessandria.  Is divided by Passo Mezzano (1063 m) from Monte Taccone and by Passo della Dagliola (858 m) and a saddle near Cascina Carrosina (825 m) from Monte Tobbio.

Access to the summit 
Monte delle Figne is accessible by signposted tracks departing from Bocchetta Pass or Isoverde (municipality of Campomorone).

The Alta Via dei Monti Liguri, a long-distance trail from Ventimiglia (province of Imperia) to Bolano (province of La Spezia), passes very close to the mountain's summit.

Nature conservation 
North-western slopes of the mountain are included in the Capanne di Marcarolo Piedmontese natural park.

References

Mountains of Liguria
Mountains of Piedmont
One-thousanders of Italy
Mountains of the Apennines